

Most of central and northern California rests on a crustal block (terrane) that is being torn from the North American continent by the passing Pacific plate of oceanic crust.  Southern California lies at the southern end of this block, where the Southern California faults create a complex and even chaotic landscape of seismic activity.

Seismic, geologic, and other data has been integrated by the Southern California Earthquake Center to produce the Community Fault Model (CFM) database that documents over 140 faults in southern California considered capable of producing moderate to large earthquakes. A three-dimensional (3D) model has been derived that can be viewed with suitable visualization software (see image). The probability of a serious earthquake on various faults has been estimated in the 2008 Uniform California Earthquake Rupture Forecast.  Details on specific faults can be found in the USGS Quaternary Fault and Fold Database.

See also 
 Basin and range topography
 Basin and Range Province
 California earthquake forecast (UCERF)
 Earthquake insurance
 List of earthquakes in California
 Plate tectonics
 San Andreas Fault
 Seismology
 Transverse Ranges
 Walker Lane

References 
Notes

Bibliography

External links 
U.S. Geological Survey 
USGS Quaternary Fault and Fold DatabaseA complete listing of known, geologically recent faults. 
Southern California Earthquake Center
Community Fault Model site, with images.
Community Fault Model Downloadable vtk files of the southern California faults.

Faults
.
Faults